Southerland may refer to:

Persons
Clarence A. Southerland (1889–1973), Justice of the Delaware Supreme Court
James Southerland, American professional basketball player
Pug Southerland (1911-1949), American Navy fighter pilot during World War II
Steve Southerland (Tennessee politician) (born 1955), member of the Tennessee House of Representatives
Steve Southerland (Florida politician) (born 1965), United States Representative for Florida's 2nd District
Thom Southerland (fl. 2000s–2010s), English theatre director
William Henry Hudson Southerland (1852–1933), rear admiral in the United States Navy

Others
USS Southerland (DD-743), a Gearing-class American destroyer
Fort Southerland, Arkansas site of a Civil War engagement, part of the Camden Expedition